Puig Estela is a mountain of Catalonia, Spain. It has an elevation of 2,013 metres above sea level., between the villages of Ogassa and Pardines.

See also
Mountains of Catalonia

References

Mountains of Catalonia